The 2010 McDonald's All-American Boys Game was an All-star basketball game played on Wednesday, March 31, 2010, at the Jerome Schottenstein Center in Columbus, Ohio, home of the Ohio State Buckeyes. The game's rosters featured the best and most highly recruited high school boys graduating in 2010.  The game was the 33rd annual version of the McDonald's All-American Game first played in 1978.

The 48 players were selected from 2,500 nominees by a committee of basketball experts. They were chosen not only for their on-court skills, but for their performances off the court as well. Coach Morgan Wootten, who had more than 1,200 wins as head basketball coach at DeMatha High School, was chairman of the selection committee. Legendary UCLA coach John Wooden, who has been involved in the McDonald's All American Games since its inception, served as chairman of the Games and as an advisor to the selection committee.

Proceeds from the 2010 McDonald's All American High School Basketball Games went to Ronald McDonald House Charities (RMHC) of Central Ohio and its Ronald McDonald House program.

2010 Game
The 2010 game was played at Ohio State University's Jerome Schottenstein Center in Columbus, Ohio on March 31, 2010.

2010 West Roster

2010 East Roster

Coaches
The West team was coached by:
 Co-Head Coach Hunter Kalman of St. Edward High School (Lakewood, Ohio)
 Co-Head Coach Thurnis Wallace of Lyons Creek Middle School (Coconut Creek, Florida)
 Asst Coach Jim Flannery of St. Edward High School (Lakewood, Ohio)

The East team was coached by:
 Co-Head Coach Dru Joyce II of St. Vincent - St. Mary High School (Akron, Ohio)
 Co-Head Coach Norm Persin of Oak Hill High School (Oak Hill, Ohio)
 Asst Coach Matt Futch of St. Vincent - St. Mary High School (Akron, Ohio)

Boxscore

Visitors: West

Home: East 

* = Starting Line-up

All-American Week

Schedule 

 Monday, March 29: Powerade Jamfest
 Slam Dunk Contest
 Three-Point Shoot-out
 Timed Basketball Skills Competition
 Wednesday, March 31: 33rd Annual Boys All-American Game

The Powerade JamFest is a skills-competition evening featuring basketball players who demonstrate their skills in three crowd-entertaining ways.  The slam dunk contest was first held in 1987, and a 3-point shooting challenge was added in 1989.  A timed basketball skills competition was added to the schedule of events in 2009.

Contest Winners 
 The 2010 Powerade Slam Dunk contest was won by Josh Selby.
 The winner of the 2010 3-point shoot-out was Cory Joseph.
 The winner of the basketball skills competition was Keith Appling.

See also
2010 McDonald's All-American Girls Game

References

External links
McDonald's All-American on the web

2009–10 in American basketball
2010
2010 in sports in Ohio
Basketball competitions in Ohio
Basketball in Columbus, Ohio
21st century in Columbus, Ohio